Luiz Roberto Tommasi is a Brazilian zoologist who specialises in Echinoderms.  he works at the Oceanographic Institute of the University of São Paulo, Brazil.

Tommasi took a Bachelor and Licenciatura in Natural History at the University of São Paulo between 1950 and 1957.  He was awarded a Doctor of Science degree from the University in 1969: the title of his dissertation was "Os Equinodermos da região da Ilha Grande" ("The Echinoderms of the Ilha Grande region").

References

Living people
Brazilian zoologists
University of São Paulo alumni
Year of birth missing (living people)